Burgers is the third album by Hot Tuna, the folk rock offshoot of Jefferson Airplane members Jorma Kaukonen, Jack Casady, and Papa John Creach, released in 1972 as Grunt FTR-1004. It was the band's first studio album, the previous two being live recordings.  "Water Song" and "Sunny Day Strut" are instrumentals composed for this album. Hot Tuna did not release the song as a single until June 1982. In 1996, RCA released the CD box set Hot Tuna in a Can which included a remastered version of this album, along with remasters of the albums Hot Tuna, First Pull Up, Then Pull Down, America's Choice and Hoppkorv.

It was voted number 748 in the third edition of Colin Larkin's All Time Top 1000 Albums (2000).

Track listing

Personnel
Jorma Kaukonen – guitars, lead vocals
Jack Casady – bass, vocals, eyebrow
Papa John Creach – violin, vocals
Sammy Piazza – drums, tympani, other percussion, vocals

Additional personnel
Nick Buck – organ, piano on "True Religion" and "Keep On Truckin'"
Richmond Talbott – vocals, slide guitar on "99 Year Blues"
David Crosby – vocals on "Highway Song"

Production
The Unknown Engineer (Joe Lopes) – recording engineer
The Masked Mixer – mixer
Betty Cantor – mixer
Bruce Steinberg – design, photography
Allen Zentz – assistant engineer
The Mighty Maurice (Pat Ieraci) – assistant engineer
Recorded at Wally Heider Studios, San Francisco
A Fishobaby Production
Reissue Liner Notes: William Ruhlmann

References
Source

Citations

Hot Tuna albums
1972 albums
Albums recorded at Wally Heider Studios
Grunt Records albums